Stephen "Steve" Dunnett (born 28 January 1950)
is a British neuroscientist, and among the most highly cited researchers in the neurosciences. Until his retirement in 2017, he was a professor at Cardiff University and the founder and co-director of the Brain Repair Group, where he worked on developing cell therapies for neurodegenerative diseases including Parkinson's disease and Huntington's disease.

Early life and education
Dunnett was born in London, where he attended Eltham College, an independent school, then won an open exhibition to study Mathematics at Churchill College, Cambridge. After graduating in 1972, he worked for several years as social worker in the London Borough of Southwark.

He returned to university to study for a second bachelor's degree in psychology at Birkbeck College, London,
from where he graduated in 1978 with the prize for the top first class degree in the Faculty of Sciences. Dunnett then returned to Cambridge University in 1978 as a research student at Clare College and was awarded a PhD in experimental psychology in 1981.

Academic career
After a brief spell as a visiting research scientist at Lund University in 1981-2, Dunnett returned to Cambridge, he was a lecturer and reader in the Department of Experimental Psychology, Fellow of Clare College from 1984 onwards, and from 1992 to 1999 he was Director of Scientific Programmes at the Medical Research Council Centre for Brain Repair. He moved to Cardiff University in 2000, where he is a full professor in the neuroscience division of the School of Biosciences. He directs the Brain Repair Group, focussing on development of novel cell based therapies for neurodegenerative disease. For many years, Dunnett was editor in chief of Brain Research Bulletin. 

He retired to France in 2017 but retains an emeritus appointment with Cardiff University.

Awards and honours
In 1988, the British Psychological Society awarded Dunnett the Spearman Medal for outstanding published work by an early-career researcher. He became a Fellow of the Royal Society of Medicine the next year, of the Academy of Medical Sciences in 2003, and of the Learned Society of Wales in 2011.  He was the Knight Visiting Professor at the University of Miami School of Medicine in 1992. Dunnett has also been awarded the Alfred Mayer medal of the British Neuropathological Society (1998) and Honorary Fellowship of the International Behavioral Neuroscience Society (2002).

Books
Books that Dunnett has co-authored or co-edited include:

References

1950 births
Living people
British neuroscientists
Fellows of Clare College, Cambridge
Academics of Cardiff University
Alumni of Churchill College, Cambridge
Alumni of Birkbeck, University of London
Alumni of Clare College, Cambridge
People educated at Eltham College